Aberfoil is an unincorporated community in Bullock County, in the U.S. state of Alabama. The main roads through the community are U.S. Route 29 and Alabama State Route 239.

History
A post office was established at Aberfoil in 1837, and remained in operation until it was discontinued in 1905. A scene of the novel Rob Roy set in Aberfoyle, Scotland, likely inspired the naming.

Demographics
According to the census returns from 1850-2010 for Alabama, it has never reported a population figure separately on the U.S. Census.

References

Unincorporated communities in Bullock County, Alabama
Unincorporated communities in Alabama